Shyam Sundar Hembram was a Santhali writer and educator. Chattarpati Kisku Rapaj is one of his notable plays, published in 1948. In 1950, he published Kherwal Akil Bati (Collection of songs). In 1990, he was honored by the All India Santali Writers Association for his contribution to the Santali language and literature.

References

Adivasi writers
20th-century Indian linguists
20th-century Indian poets
Santali people
Santali writers